{{DISPLAYTITLE:C11H10N2O2}}
The molecular formula C11H10N2O2 (molar mass: 202.21 g/mol, exact mass: 202.0742 u) may refer to:

 Tolimidone
 Vasicinone

Molecular formulas